Muhammad Amrullah Tuanku Muhammad Abdullah Saleh (1840 in West Sumatra – 1909 in West Sumatra) also known as Tuanku Kisai, was a great scholar of Minangkabau and an ancestor of two major figures in the Malay world. One man is his own son, Abdul Karim Amrullah, and another is his grandson, Hamka. His grandfather was Tuanku Nan Tuo, one of the prime movers of the Padri in West Sumatra.

Muhammad Amrullah one of his followers Naqshbandi. Amrullah listed as one of Kaum Tua movement. His child, Abdul Karim Amrullah, was a pioneer and major figure in the struggle, including Kaum Muda. Abdul Karim Amrullah reject the Naqshbandi deeds, while rejecting the bond 'taqlid', and more likely inclined to the thought of Muhammad Abduh. Amrullah have eight times the marriage, and the number of all the children are 46 people.

Origin
His father, Tuanku Abdullah Saleh who the title Tuanku Sheikh Guguk Katur. He was a disciple of Abdullah Arif or known as Tuanku Nan Tuo in Koto Tuo, Agam Regency.

Tuanku Abdullah Saleh was a great scholar's attention on the science and memorized the book of Hikam Sufism of Ibn 'Athaillah. He was a Minangkabau custom experts, so that not only matters of religion that prompted people to him, even the custom affairs. Imam al-Ghazali on khalawat highly consumed by him. His teacher, Tuanku Nan Tuo, interested him and after his daughter Siti Saerah a teenage girl, he take Tuanku Abdullah Saleh as son-in law.

Education
He earned his early education from his own grandfather and grandmother in the tradition of the Minangkabau. Later he studied religion from his grandfather Sheikh Tuanku Pariaman in Koto Tuo. From her grandmother, Muhammad Amrullah learn nahwu, Sharaf, Manthiq, Ma'ani, Tafseer and Fiqh.

In Mecca he studied to Ahmad Zayni Dahlan, a famous scholar of Mecca, and learn also to Sheikh Mohammed Hasbullah and several other scholars. He also studied with Ahmad Khatib and Tahir Jalaluddin. At the age of 26, Muhammad Amrullah have been given a diploma and a teaching assignment by his grandfather, Abdullah Arif or Tuanku Nan Tuo in the village. He taught are the science of Tafsir, Fiqh, Sufi, and the sciences tools, namely nahwu, Sharaf, Manthiq, Ma'ani, Bayan, Badi '.

References

Indonesian Muslims
Minangkabau people
1909 deaths
1840 births
People from West Sumatra